The 2020 Nordic Golf League is the 22nd season of the Nordic Golf League (NGL), one of four third-tier tours recognised by the European Tour. The season started with four events in Spain. After a break due to the COVID-19 pandemic, the schedule was subject to change and several tournaments were postponed, cancelled or, due to travel restrictions, taken away from the Nordic Golf League Order of Merit Golfbox Road to Europe.

The tour announced on 20 July 2020, that (provided that at least 10 events would be completed, which was done on August 7) the top three players on the final Order of Merit receive a Challenge Tour category for the 2021 season, placed bottom of category 13, 14 and 15 respectively.

Qualifying School First Stage for the 2021 Nordic Golf League season took place over 36 holes in Sweden 30 September – 1 October 2020 at Barsebäck Golf & Country Club, Stockholm Golf Club and Kungsbacka Golf Club simultaneously and in Denmark 6–7 October 2020 at Greve Golf Club. 15 spots divided between the three Swedish venues and 9 spots at the Danish competition were available for a new temporary category, 7A. Due to the fact that the 2020 Nordic Golf League categories has been frozen and will also apply for 2021, no final qualifier was played.

Schedule
The following table lists official events during the 2020 season.

Unofficial events
The following events were sanctioned by the Nordic Golf League, but did not carry official money, nor were wins official.

Order of Merit
The Order of Merit was titled as the GolfBox Road to Europe and was based on prize money won during the season, calculated using a points-based system. The top three players on the tour (not otherwise exempt) earned status to play on the 2021 Challenge Tour.

See also
2020 Danish Golf Tour
2020 Swedish Golf Tour

Notes

References

Nordic Golf League